The 1973 William & Mary Indians football team represented the College of William & Mary as a member of the Southern Conference (SoCon) during the 1973 NCAA Division I football season. Led by Jim Root in his second year as head coach, William & Mary finished the season 6–5 overall and 3–2 in SoCon play to place third.

Schedule

References

William and Mary
William & Mary Tribe football seasons
William and Mary Indians football